Thapovanam, Shelter of Hope, Sulthan Bathery Wayanad, Kerala, India is an endeavor of the Eparchy of Sulthan Bathery. This house is a rehabilitation centre for the mentally ill persons. Geevarghese Mar Divannasios, the Bishop of Sulthan Bathery founded this house of hope in 2002. Rev. Fr. Wilson Kochupilackal is the founder-director of this house. The house gives shelter to the persons who are abandoned on the street without any discrimination of caste or creed. At present there are 51 persons including 9 women and 2 children. All these persons are taken to this house of hope by the director and the volunteers. They are doing this service to fulfill the words of Christ "Just as you did it to one of the least of these, who are members of my family,  you did it to me" (Mt. 25, 40). And this house is run with the help of the charity of many.

References

External links
Syro-Malankara Catholic Church

Syro-Malankara Catholic Church
Wayanad district